Daniel Schwartz (born 1980/1981) is an American businessman and the Executive Chairman of Restaurant Brands International Inc. as well as Co-Chairman of RBI's Board of Directors, the parent company of Burger King, Popeyes and Tim Hortons.

Early life and education
Schwartz was raised on Long Island, New York. His father was a doctor. He is of Jewish descent. In 1998, he graduated from The Wheatley School. Schwartz holds a Bachelor of Science degree in Applied Economics and Management from Cornell University.

Career
In 2005, Schwartz was hired by 3G, a Brazilian investment firm. In 2010, 3G Capital acquired Burger King and Schwartz was appointed as CFO.

In August 2014, Restaurant Brands International Inc. (RBI) was created after the acquisition of the Tim Hortons brand and Schwartz was appointed Chief Executive Officer in December of that year.

References

American chief executives of food industry companies
American chief financial officers
American people of Jewish descent
Cornell University alumni
1980s births
Living people
Restaurant Brands International
The Wheatley School alumni
Fellows of the American Physical Society